Nikolaos Sophianos (c. 1500 – after 1551) was a Greek Renaissance humanist and cartographer chiefly noted for his Totius Graeciae Descriptio map and his grammar of Greek. He was born into the local nobility of Corfu at the beginning of the 16th century and was educated at the Greek Quirinal College in Rome, co-founded by another Greek scholar, Janus Lascaris, who also became his teacher along with Arsenius Apostolius. Sophianos did not return to live in Greece; only briefly visiting in 1543. He spent the rest of his life in Rome where he became a librarian, and Venice where he worked as a copyist. His cartographical work was published in 1540.

Known works
He Grammatike tes Koines Ton Hellenon Glosses-a Greek grammar
Totius Graeciae Descriptio-a historical map of Greece

References

External links
World Digital Library presentation of Nicolai Gerbelij in descriptionem Graeciae Sophiani, praefatio or Preface of Nicolas Gerbelius to Sophianos’s Description of Greece.  Library of Congress. Panoramic map image of Sophianos’s only known cartographic work of his native country.

See also
Greek scholars in the Renaissance

16th-century Greek people
Greek Renaissance humanists
1500s births
Modern Greek language
Year of death unknown
Greek_cartographers
16th-century Greek educators
People from Corfu